729 Watsonia is a rare-type asteroid and namesake of the Watsonia family from the central region of the asteroid belt. It was named after the Canadian-American astronomer James C. Watson. Watsonia occulted the star  54 Leonis (HIP 53417, a 4.3 Magnitude Star) on 2013 Mar 03 at 01:48.

Description 

This object is the namesake of the Watsonia family, an Asteroid family of approximately 100 asteroids that share similar spectral properties and orbital elements; hence they may have arisen from the same collisional event. All members have a relatively high orbital inclination.

References

External links
 
 

Watsonia asteroids
Watsonia
Watsonia
STGD-type asteroids (Tholen)
L-type asteroids (SMASS)
19120209